The Plant Auto Company Building was a building at 38 South 200 West (State Route 91) in Richmond, Utah which was built in 1916.  It was listed on the National Register of Historic Places in 2004, but was later demolished, and it has been delisted from the National Register.

This one-part Victorian Eclectic commercial block was built in 1916 and housed the first automobile repair shop in Richmond.

It is no longer standing.

References

National Register of Historic Places in Cache County, Utah
Victorian architecture in Utah
Buildings and structures completed in 1916

Former National Register of Historic Places in Utah